1997 Denmark Open is a darts tournament, which took place in Denmark in 1997.

Results

References

1997 in darts
1997 in Danish sport
Darts in Denmark